Colvin Lake may refer to:

Colvin Lake (Michigan), a lake in the United States
Colvin Lake Provincial Park, a park in Canada